Kohat is a city in Khyber Pakhtunkhwa, Pakistan.

Kohat may also refer to:

Kohat Division, an administrative unit of Khyber Pakhtunkhwa
Kohat District, a district within the division
Kohat Tehsil, a tehsil within the district, including several "Union Councils":
Kohat (Urban-I)
Kohat (Urban-II)
Kohat (Urban-III)
Kohat (Urban-IV)
Kohat (Urban-V)
Kohat (Urban-VI)
Kohat Subdivision, formerly Frontier Region Kohat, a region of Khyber Pakhtunkhwa adjacent to Kohat District
Kohat Tunnel, a highway tunnel under the Khigana Mountains, Pakistan

See also
Kohat Enclave metro station, a railway station in India
Kohat University of Science and Technology, a university in Pakistan.